The 1955 San Francisco 49ers season was the franchise's 6th season in the National Football League and their 10th overall. 

They were coming off a 7–4–1 record in 1954, finishing in 3rd place in the Western Conference.

San Francisco replaced head coach Buck Shaw, who had been the club's only head coach since its founding. The new coach was Red Strader, who had previously been the head coach of the New York Yanks from 1950 to 1951, where he had a record of 8–14–2 in his two seasons there.

The 49ers started the year with 2 losses at home but rebounded with 2 road victories and sat with a .500 record after 4 games. San Francisco split its next 2 games at home and had a 3–3 record. The team then fell into a slump and lost its next 5 games before winning its final game of the season, finishing with a 4–8 record, its worst season since the team's first season in the NFL in 1950, when it finished 3–9.

Offensively, Y. A. Tittle threw for 2185 yards, completing 51.2% of his passes, and had a league-high 17 touchdown passes. However, Tittle had 28 passes that were intercepted. Billy Wilson was Tittle's favorite target, as he had a team-high 53 receptions for 831 yards and 7 touchdowns. Joe Perry led the club by rushing for 701 yards, while Dickie Moegle rushed for a team-high 5 touchdowns.

Schedule

Standings

References
SHRP Sports
Database Football

San Francisco 49ers seasons
San Francisco 49ers